Vinod Prabhakar, also known as Vinod, is an Indian film actor, who has worked predominantly in Kannada movie industry. Vinod made his debut with the Kannada film Dil.

Filmography

Films

External links

References 

Living people
1980 births
Indian actors